

This page lists board and card games, wargames, miniatures games, and tabletop role-playing games published in 2001.  For video games, see 2001 in video gaming.

Games released in 2001

Game awards given in 2001
 Spiel des Jahres: Carcassonne
 Games: Evo

Significant gaming-related events in 2001
Mongoose Publishing founded.

See also
 2001 in video gaming

Games
Games by year